Joaquín Suárez is a village in the Canelones Department of southern Uruguay. (Suárez is also the name of the municipality to which the village belongs.) It is at the intersection of Routes 84 and 74, northeast of Toledo and southwest of Pando. The villages are all considered parts of the wider metropolitan area of Montevideo.

History
Joaquín Suárez is named after the president of Uruguay from 1843–1852. The creation of a villa (town) in the area was approved by decree on 21 July 1866; it was founded on 15 October 1882 by Francisco Piria. It was declared a pueblo (village) on 2 October 1929 by the Act of Ley Nº 8.482.

Places of worship
 Parish Church of St. Francis of Assisi (Roman Catholic, Dominican Sisters of the Presentation)

Population
In 2011 Joaquín Suárez had a population of 6,570.

 
Source: Instituto Nacional de Estadística de Uruguay

References

External links

INE map of Villa Crespo y San Andrés, Toledo, Fracc.Camino del Andaluz y R.84, Joaquín Suárez, Fracc.sobre Ruta 74, Villa San José, Villa San Felipe, Villa Hadita, Seis Hermanos and Villa Porvenir

Populated places in the Canelones Department